Major-General Brendan Peter McGuinness  (born 26 June 1931) is a former British Army officer.

Military career
Educated at Mount St Mary's College, McGuinness was commissioned into the Royal Artillery in 1950 and saw active service in Borneo in 1966 during the Indonesia–Malaysia confrontation. He became commanding officer of 45 Medium Regiment in 1972. He went on to be commander Royal Artillery for 1st Armoured Division in 1975, Deputy Commander, North East District in 1981 and General Officer Commanding Western District in 1983 before retiring in 1986.

In 1968 he married Ethne Patricia Kelly; they have one son and one daughter.

References

 

1931 births
Living people
British Army generals
Companions of the Order of the Bath
Royal Artillery officers
People educated at Mount St Mary's College